Penicillium sumatrense is a species of fungus in the genus Penicillium which was isolated from the rhizosphere of the plant Lumnitzera racemosa. Penicillium sumatrense produces sumalarin A, sumalarin B, sumalarin C

References

Further reading 
 
 
 
 

sumatrense